Bahraich is a city and a municipal board in Bahraich district  in the state of Uttar Pradesh, India. The districts of Barabanki, Gonda, Balrampur, Lakhimpur Kheri, Shravasti and Sitapur share local boundaries with Bahraich. A factor which makes this town important is the international border shared with Nepal..

Geography and climate
Bahraich has a warm humid subtropical climate with  hot summers from April to July. The rainy season is from July to mid-September when Bahraich gets an average rainfall from the south-west monsoon winds, and occasionally frontal rainfall will occur in January. Fog is quite common from late December to late January. Summers are extremely hot with temperatures rising to the  range, the average highs being in the high of 30s (degree Celsius).

Demographics
As of 2011 Indian Census, Bahraich had a total population of 186,223, of which 97,653 were males and 88,570 were females. Population within the age group of 0 to 6 years was 24,097. The total number of literates in Bahraich was 119,564, which constituted 64.2% of the population with male literacy of 66.5% and female literacy of 61.7%. The effective literacy rate of 7+ population of Bahraich was 73.7%, of which male literacy rate was 76.4% and female literacy rate was 70.8%. The Scheduled Castes and Scheduled Tribes population was 9,584 and 170 respectively. Bahraich had 30460 households in 2011.

Religion

Majority of the population of Bahraich are Muslims (56%), followed by Hindus (42%), with small populations of Sikhs, Jains, Christians and Buddhists.

Politics
Bahraich is divided into two parliamentary constituencies, Bahraich and Kaiserganj. The former is held by Akshaibar Lal of the Bharatiya Janata Party (BJP) and the latter by Brij Bhushan Sharan Singh, also of the BJP.

There are seven State Assembly constituencies:
 Bahraich – Anupama Jaiswal (BJP)
 Matera – Yasar Shah (Samajwadi Party)
 Mahasi – Sureshwar Singh (BJP)
 Kaiserganj – Mukut Bihari Verma (BJP)
 Balha – Saroj Sonkar (BJP)
 Payagpur – Subhash Tripathi (BJP)
 Nanpara – Madhuri Verma (BJP)

Transportation

Roads
Bahraich is well connected with other districts of Uttar Pradesh. UPSRTC and private operators provide road connectivity to Lucknow, Kanpur, Allahabad, Varanasi, Bareilly, Haridwar, Shimla, Delhi, Muradabad, Rampur, Ghaziabad, Shahajahanpur, Jaipur, Sitapur, Lakhimpur, Hardoi, Unnao, Balrampur, Gonda, Barabanki, Pratapgarh, Shimla, Mathura, Jhansi, Jaunpur, Gorakhpur, Basti, Varanasi, Shravasti and Agra. There are buses for Lucknow in every 15 minutes. National Highway 927 (India) connects the city to Barabanki and state capital Lucknow.

Railways

Bahraich railway station is a main railway station in Bahraich district, Uttar Pradesh. Its code is BRK. It serves Bahraich city. The station consists of 3 platforms, two for broad gauge and one for meter gauge. Bahraich to Jarwal Road is a Broad gauge station 55 kilometers (34 miles) from district headquarters and lies on Delhi–Barauni line. Plans for converting the Bahraich – Gonda tracks to broad-gauge have been in talks since October 2018. It is complete as of July 2020, but due to lack of electrification, only diesel locomotives are run in these tracks. According to the railway board,  crore is to be invested to electrify the whole Bahraich-Gonda-Balrampur-Gorakhpur line, with expected completion by the year 2021.

Media
Bahraich has an All India Radio relay station known as Akashvani Bahraich. It broadcasts on FM frequencies @ 100.1 .

Notable people

 Farhat Ehsas – Urdu poet
 Syed Zafar Mahmood- Indian Civil-Servant and former 'Officer on Special Duty' for the Indian Prime Minister Manmohan Singh
 Tahir Mahmood – former Chairman, National Minorities Commission
 Meena Shah - national badminton champion of India. recipient of the Padma Shri and the Arjuna award
 Waqar Ahmad Shah – former speaker of Uttar Pradesh Legislative Assembly and former cabinet minister in the Government of Uttar Pradesh
 Yasar Shah – Former cabinet minister in the Government of Uttar Pradesh
 Mohsin Zaidi – Urdu poet

References

External links
Bahraich District Govt. of Uttar Pradesh, Brief History 
Municipal Board Of Bahraich Website  
Location & Road Map of Bahraich
Bahraich – Places of Interest
Muslims in Bahraich, UP's Most Marginalised District

 
Cities and towns in Bahraich district
Cities in Uttar Pradesh